The Thor DM-18A was an American suborbital launch vehicle. It flew 50 times. It had 6 failures, 3 partial failures, and 41 successes. It had a 82% launch reliability. Its first flight attempt was on 5 November 1958. Its first successful launch was on 16 December 1958. Its last launch was on 19 June 1962. The Thor DM-18A was evolved from the Thor DM-18, the first Thor rocket. Thor DM-18A was the first operational finless variant of the original missile.

Launch history

Launch statistics

Launch outcome

Launchpad

References

Lists of Thor launches
Lists of Thor and Delta launches
Lists of rocket launches